Piia Leino (born 1977) is a Finnish writer. She studied at the University of Tampere and now lives in Helsinki where she works as a journalist. She also studied creative writing at the Kriittinen korkeakoulu (Critical Academy) in Helsinki. She has published two novels until date: Ruma Kassa (The Ugly Cashier) and Taivas (Heaven). The latter won the EU Prize for Literature in 2019.

References

Finnish writers
1977 births
Living people
Date of birth missing (living people)
University of Tampere alumni